Hard Fortune Creek is a stream in the U.S. state of Georgia.  It is a tributary to Headstall Creek.

Hard Fortune Creek's name reflects the hardships experienced by pioneers.

References

Rivers of Georgia (U.S. state)
Rivers of McDuffie County, Georgia